Perth Leisure Pool is the main indoor public leisure and recreation centre in the city of Perth, Scotland, one of the most popular visitor attractions in Scotland and a major tourist attraction, which in 2006 was noted for receiving more than 700,000 visitors a year.

Development
It was designed in 1984 after an architectural contest run by the RIAS and Perth Council which was won by architects FaulknerBrowns. Councillor John L. Wilson presided over the development of the Perth Leisure Pool and it was opened by The Princess Royal on 29 July 1988.

Facilities
The complex includes 5 swimming pools with flumes, bubble beds and other water features; a gym, health spa, cafe, creche and outdoor children's play area. The combination of leisure and swimming facilities has proved outstandingly successful and, in twenty years, it has had over ten million visitors. The small slide for this pool provides suitably scaled-down thrills for children and is very popular.

Maintenance
It has been well maintained since opening, with refurbishments taking place every few years.  However, in August 2002, there was an outbreak of cryptosporidiosis which caused gastrointestinal illness for 74 people.  This resulted in the closure of the pool while the matter was investigated.  Numerous improvements to the cleaning and water treatment processes were recommended by the Outbreak Control Team and these were made prior to the reopening of the centre.

References

Further reading

External links
 Home Website

Swimming venues in Scotland
Tourist attractions in Perth and Kinross
Buildings and structures in Perth, Scotland